The Hon. Kenneth Arthur Newton Jones (1924–1964), better known as Ken Jones, was a Jamaican politician and former Minister of Communications and Works (1962–1964).

Early life 
Ken Jones and his twin brother Keith were born on September 1, 1924 in Portland Parish of Jamaica. Their father, Frederick McDonald Jones O.B.E., was a planter and a prominent member of the local Anglican Church. Their mother, Gladys (nee Smith), was a Quaker Missionary. She was a graduate of William Penn College in Oskaloosa, Iowa, and she arrived at Happy Grove School in Portland in 1918 for her mission. Gladys Jones played an important role in the school, including helping to initiate the transformation of the school into an academic high school. In 1959, she was awarded MBE by Queen Elizabeth the Second. Other children of Fred and Gladys include Evan Jones (born December 29, 1927), who became a poet, playwright and screenwriter.

Ken Jones attended Munro College, a boarding school for boys in St Elizabeth, Jamaica, between 1935 and 1942. After that, he left Jamaica to attended Earlham College in Indiana, but soon, in 1943, he joined the Royal Air Force. Upon completion of his training in Canada, Ken Jones served as a Flight Sergeant. During the war, there were about 400 Jamaicans serving as RAF air crew, and Ken Jones was one of them.

Career in Public Service 
In 1946, Ken Jones returned to Jamaica. He first worked in the business, and in 1951, he was elected to the Portland Parochial Board, which marked the beginning of his career in public service. In 1953, he served as a Justice of the Peace. In 1955, he was elected to the House of Representatives as the member for Eastern Portland. In 1962, Ken Jones was appointed Minister of Communications and Works of Jamaica. The major achievements during his tenure include:
 Launching a program to twin the bridges on the national highway.
 Commencing work on the Sandy Gully Drainage System in Kingston.
 Instituting a program to build post offices with living quarters upstairs. 
 Trans Atlantic telephone service was opened to the UK and agreements were in place for Air Canada and Lufthansa to commence service to Jamaica.

Marriage 
In 1958, Ken Jones was married to Marlene d'Auvergne Holtz of Kingston. Gladys Rebecca Jones, their daughter, was born in 1960.

Death 
On October 11, 1964, Ken Jones died in an untimely manner. The Daily Gleaner, Jamaica's most important newspaper, reports his death in these words:

"Gleaner Staff Reporter

"MONTEGO BAY, S.J., Oct. 11:

"THE HON. KENNETH JONES, Minister of Communications and Works, died in the Montego Bay hospital this morning as a result of injuries he suffered in a fall from the upstairs balcony of his room at the Sunset Lodge Hotel, where members of the Cabinet, other members of the Parliament and their top Civil Service advisers were spending the week-end in a special 'retreat' conference to review Government politics and plan future action."

However, the true cause of Ken Jones' death is mysterious and controversial. Many believe he might have been a victim of political assassination. In 1994, The Daily Gleaner published a series of articles questioning the legitimacy of the inquest and other suspicious circumstances of his death.

Legacy 
A few places in Jamaica are named in Ken Jones' honour, including:
 The Ken Jones Aerodrome in St. Margaret’s Bay 
 The Ken Jones Highway in St. Thomas 
 The Ken Jones Park in Manchioneal
 The Ken Jones Post Office in Haddington, Hanover

Ken Jones' mysterious death is portrayed in his brother Evan Jones' 1998 novel Stone Haven. A fictionalized Ken Jones in the name of "Sir Arthur George Jennings" is one of the narrators of Marlon James' 2014 novel A Brief History of Seven Killings.

References 

Jamaican twins
1924 births
1964 deaths
People from Portland Parish
Earlham College alumni
Royal Air Force personnel of World War II
Members of the House of Representatives of Jamaica
20th-century Jamaican politicians
Government ministers of Jamaica